The  Asian Men's Volleyball Championship was the eleventh staging of the Asian Men's Volleyball Championship, a biennial international volleyball tournament organised by the Asian Volleyball Confederation (AVC) with Korea Volleyball Association (KVA). The tournament was held in Changwon, South Korea from 8 to 16 September 2001.

Venue

Pools composition
The teams are seeded based on their final ranking at the 1999 Asian Men's Volleyball Championship.

* Withdrew

 Preliminary round 

Pool A

|}

|}

Pool B

|}

|}

Pool C

|}

|}

Pool D

|}

|}

 Quarterfinals 
 The results and the points of the matches between the same teams that were already played during the preliminary round shall be taken into account for the Quarterfinals.''

Pool E

|}

|}

Pool F

|}

|}

Pool G

|}

|}

Pool H

|}

|}

Classification 9th–12th

Semifinals

|}

11th place

|}

9th place

|}

Classification 5th–8th

Semifinals

|}

7th place

|}

5th place

|}

Final round

Semifinals

|}

3rd place

|}

Final

|}

Final standing

Awards
MVP:  Shin Jin-sik
Best Scorer:  Benjamin Hardy
Best Spiker:  Lee Kyung-soo
Best Blocker:  Dan Howard
Best Server:  Shin Jin-sik
Best Setter:  Choi Tae-woong
Best Digger:  Kenji Yamamoto
Best Receiver:  Yeo Oh-hyun

References
Results

V
A
Asian men's volleyball championships
V